Robert J. Kane (April 30, 1967  February 5, 2021) was an American politician. He was a Republican member of the Connecticut Senate, representing the 32nd district from 2009 to 2017, and served as Connecticut state auditor from 2017 until his death in 2021.

Kane was the State Senator for the 32nd senate district, representing part of the Naugatuck River Valley and Litchfield County in the Connecticut Senate, including the towns of Bethlehem, Bridgewater, Middlebury (part), Oxford, Roxbury, Seymour (part), Southbury, Washington, Watertown, and Woodbury. He was appointed to the position of Auditor of Public Accountants in January 2017, and served in the role alongside Democrat John Geragosian. He lived in Watertown, Connecticut.

Kane graduated from Central Connecticut State University and later earned an M.B.A. from the University of New Haven in 2009.

The former state senator's chief accomplishment as a legislator was the Safe Harbor for Exploited Children Act, which aimed to protect minors who have been victims of human trafficking and increased penalties for traffickers.

Kane was found dead in his home in Watertown, on February 5, 2021, at the age of 53.

References 

1967 births
2021 deaths
21st-century American politicians
Central Connecticut State University alumni
Republican Party Connecticut state senators
People from Watertown, Connecticut
University of New Haven alumni